A Twenty20 International (T20I) is a form of cricket, played between two of the international members of the International Cricket Council (ICC), in which each team faces a maximum of twenty overs. The matches have top-class status and are the highest T20 standard. The game is played under the rules of Twenty20 cricket. Starting from the format's inception in 2005, T20I status only applied to Full Members and some Associate Member teams. However, in April 2018, the ICC announced that it would grant T20I status to all its 105 members from 1 January 2019.

The shortened format was initially introduced to bolster crowds for the domestic game, and was not intended to be played internationally, but the first Twenty20 International took place on 17 February 2005 when Australia defeated New Zealand, and the first tournament was played two years later, with the introduction of the ICC T20 World Cup. In 2016, for the first time in a calendar year, more Twenty20 International matches (100) were played than ODI matches (99). As of November 2021, 90 nations feature in ICC T20I team rankings.

Twenty20 International format also sees one mandatory powerplay taken in the first six overs. This shorter format of the game makes reaching the traditional milestones of scoring a century or taking five wickets in an innings more difficult, and few players have achieved these. The highest individual score in a Twenty20 International is 172, made by Australia's Aaron Finch against Zimbabwe in 2018, while Nigeria's Peter Aho has the best bowling figures of 6/5 against Sierra Leone in October 2021.

Origins
Cricket itself was probably first played in England in the Late Middle Ages, but it did not rise to prominence until the eighteenth century. A set of laws were drawn up in 1744, and the game achieved a level of relative standardisation by the late nineteenth century. One-day cricket was trialled in 1962, and the first domestic tournament played the following year, and in 1971, England and Australia contested the first One Day International. The match consisted of one innings for each side, with 40 eight-ball overs.

In the 1990s, a number of countries were exploring the possibility of a shorter game still: in New Zealand, Martin Crowe developed Cricket Max, in which each team bats for 10 eight-ball overs, while in Australia they considered an eight-a-side contest they dubbed "Super 8s". At the same time, the England and Wales Cricket Board (ECB) conducted consumer research, and proposed the idea of a 20 overs-per-side contest, which would last for about three hours. The first match was played in 2003 between Hampshire and Sussex.

History
The first Twenty20 International match between two men's sides was played on 17 February 2005, involving Australia and New Zealand. Wisden Cricketers' Almanack reported that "neither side took the game especially seriously", and it was noted by ESPNcricinfo that but for a large score for Ricky Ponting, "the concept would have shuddered". However, Ponting himself said "if it does become an international game then I'm sure the novelty won't be there all the time".

Two further matches were played that year; England beat Australia in June, and South Africa were defeated by New Zealand in October. Early the following year, a contest between New Zealand and the West Indies finished as the first tied match, and a tiebreak was played for the first time in men's international cricket: the two sides took part in a bowl-out to determine a winner; New Zealand won 3–0.

The game had initially been developed to boost the interest in domestic cricket, and to aid this the international teams were only allowed to host three T20Is each year. The cricket manager for the ICC, David Richardson, also commented that "Part of the success of Twenty20 cricket is making sure it can coexist with Test cricket and one-dayers." Despite this, the first international tournament was held in 2007 in South Africa; the 2007 ICC World Twenty20. That tournament was won by India, who defeated their close rivals Pakistan in the final. Writing for The Guardian, Dilip Premachandran suggested that the competition's success meant that "the format is here to stay". The next tournament was scheduled for 2009, and it was decided that they would take place biannually (more frequently than the 50 over Cricket World Cup, which occurs once every four years). In the opening match of the 2007 World Twenty20, Chris Gayle scored the first century in a T20I, the achievement being reached in the twentieth match of the format.

The 500th T20I match was contested between Ireland and the United Arab Emirates at the Sheikh Zayed Stadium, Abu Dhabi on 16 February 2016.

ICC decided to use Umpire Decision Review System (DRS) in Twenty20 Internationals from the end of September 2017, with its first use in the India-Australia T20I series in October 2017.

Current international rankings

Teams with T20I status

Permanent T20I status

Prior to 2019, permanent T20I status was limited to the Test-playing nations (the full members of the ICC), which included 12 teams after the promotion of Afghanistan and Ireland to full member status in 2017. In April 2018, the ICC announced that it would grant T20I status to all of its 105 members from 1 January 2019. Nations that have played T20I cricket are listed below, with the date of their first T20I after gaining permanent T20I status shown in brackets (some of these nations had previously played T20Is with temporary status):

Temporary T20I status
Between 2005 and 2018, the ICC granted temporary ODI and T20I status to a selection of other teams (known as Associate members). Teams earned this temporary status for a period of four years based on their performance in the quadrennial ICC World Cricket League – or, more specifically, based on the top six finishing positions at the ICC World Cup Qualifier, which is the final event of the World Cricket League. Teams could also earn this status by qualifying for the ICC T20 World Cup.

Twelve nations held this temporary T20I status before being promoted to T20I status or relegated after underperforming at the World Cup Qualifier or World Twenty20 Qualifier:
  (from 1 September 2007, until 30 January 2014)
  (from 12 September 2007, until 20 June 2018)
  (from 2 August 2008, until 12 March 2017)
  (from 2 August 2008, until 29 July 2018)
  (from 2 August 2008, until 28 January 2014)
  (from 3 August 2008, until 8 April 2009)
  (from 1 February 2010, until 5 June 2017)
  (from 16 March 2014, until 29 July 2018)
  (from 16 March 2014, until 18 January 2017)
  (from 17 March 2014, until 22 October 2018)
  (from 13 July 2015, until 17 March 2018)
  (from 25 July 2015, until 19 January 2017)

The ICC has also given special T20I status to the ICC World XI team for:
The 2017 Independence Cup, a three match series versus Pakistan national team to help revive international cricket in Pakistan.
The Hurricane Relief T20 Challenge, a one-off match against West Indies on 31 May 2018, to raise funds for stadiums damaged by Hurricane Irma and Hurricane Maria in September 2017.

Cricket at international multi-sport events

Cricket was played as part of the 1900 Summer Olympics, when England and France contested a two-day match. In 1998, cricket was played as part of the Commonwealth Games, on this occasion in the 50-over format. There was some talk about Twenty20 cricket being part of the 2010 Commonwealth Games, which were held in Delhi, but at the time the Board of Control for Cricket in India (BCCI), were not in favour of the short format of the game, and it was not included. 

Cricket was played in 2010 Asian Games in Guangzhou, China and 2014 Asian Games in Incheon, South Korea. India skipped both times. There was further calls for subsequent Commonwealth Games and Olympic Games. The Commonwealth Games Federation asked the ICC to participate in the 2014 and 2018 Commonwealth Games, but the ICC turned down the invitation. In 2010, the International Olympic Committee recognised the International Cricket Council as a governing body that complied to the requirements of the Olympic charter which in turn meant that cricket could apply to be included in the Olympic Games, but in 2013 the ICC announced that it had no intentions to make such an application, primarily due to opposition from the  BCCI. ESPNcricinfo suggested that the opposition might be based on the possible loss of income. In April 2016, ICC chief executive David Richardson said that Twenty20 cricket can have a chance of getting in for the 2024 Summer Games, but there must be collective support shown by the ICC's membership base, in particular from BCCI, in order for there to be a chance of inclusion.

Statistics

The highest team total in a T20I was made by Afghanistan versus Ireland when they scored 278/3. The lowest total was recorded in 2019, when Czech Republic bowled out Turkey for just 21 runs. The highest successful chase was made in February 2018, when Australia scored 245 runs to overhaul New Zealand's target and win the match. 

 Virat Kohli  has scored the most runs in the format with 4,008 Aaron Finch has made the highest individual score in T20Is, with his innings of 172 against Zimbabwe in 2018. Sri Lankan bowler Lasith Malinga holds the records for the most wickets, having taken 107 wickets in 84 matches, whilst India's Deepak Chahar recorded the best bowling figures when he took 6 wickets for 7 runs against Bangladesh in November 2019.

See also
 List of International Cricket Council members
 Women's Twenty20 International

References